The following tables compare general and technical information for some user interface markup languages. Please see the individual markup languages' articles for further information.

General information
Basic general information about the markup languages: creator, version, etc.

Features
Some features of the markup languages.

See also
List of user interface markup languages
Adobe Integrated Runtime (AIR)
Adobe Flex
JavaFX
Silverlight, XAML

References

User interface markup languages